The following is an episode list for the American-Japanese animated television series Bionic Six. The series ran for two seasons with a total of 65 episodes being aired. Bionic Six was produced by TMS Entertainment and distributed by MCA Television (later renamed NBC/Universal Television).

Episode list

Season 1  (Spring 1987)

Season 2 (Fall 1987)

Notes

References

Bionic Six
Lists of Japanese television series episodes